Shahryar Mohammad Khan (born 12 March 1934) is a former career Pakistan diplomat who became Foreign Secretary of Pakistan in 1990, and remained so until his retirement from service in 1994. He later served as United Nations Special Representative of the Secretary-General to Rwanda (1994–1996), and wrote the book Shallow Graves of Rwanda on his experiences on what Rwanda went through. Since August 1999, he has intermittently served as the chairman of Pakistan Cricket Board, and also served as the president of Asian Cricket Council in 2016.

Early life and background
Shaharyar Muhammed Khan was born in the Qasr-e-Sultani Palace (now Saifia College), in the Bhopal State (honoured with 19-gun salute until 1947) in British India. He is the only son and male heir of both Nawab Muhammad Sarwar Ali Khan, the ruler of former princely state of Kurwai and princess Begum Abida Sultan (Suraya Jah, and Nawab Gauhar-i-Taj), herself the Crown Princess and the eldest daughter of last ruling Nawab of Bhopal, Haji-Hafiz Sir Muhammad Nawab Hamidullah Khan, who reigned state of Bhopal after a prolonged era of Begums regime (the queens), and his wife Begum Maimoona Sultan. Khan is descended from the royal family of former princely state of Bhopal where his ancestors had emigrated to during first quarter of the eighteenth century from Afghanistan. His mother was to succeed the titles and privileges associated with the ruling house of Bhopal, but she emigrated to the newly formed Pakistan after the partition of India, therefore her aunt, Sajida Sultan, was succeeded by her father and was recognized by the government of India as Begum of Bhopal in 1961. The Begum of Bhopal, Sultan Jahan, was his grandmother, and her mother and predecessor, Shah Jahan Begum, was his great-grandmother. The cricketer and the 8th Nawab of Pataudi, Iftikhar Ali Khan Pataudi, is his uncle by marriage (Sajida's husband). Khan is the first cousin of the cricketer and the 9th Nawab of Pataudi, Mansoor Ali Khan Pataudi, and the titular Begum of Bhopal, Saleha Sultan. The actors Saif Ali Khan and Soha Ali Khan, and the cricketer Saad Bin Jung are his nephews and niece.

Khan studied at the following institutes:
Daly College, Indore
Prince of Wales Royal Indian Military College, Dehradun
University of Cambridge
The Fletcher School–Tufts University

Career, retirement and literary work

He worked for a year with Burmah Shell Oil, and in 1957, joined the Pakistani foreign service. In 1960, he was posted as a Third Secretary in the Pakistani High Commission in London, and was promoted to Second Secretary in the Tunis embassy from 1962 to 1966. In 1976, Shahryar Khan became Pakistan's ambassador to Jordan (1976–1982) and the United Kingdom (1987–1990) He also stayed as Pakistan Ambassador to France (1999–2001) and Chairman, Committee on Foreign Service Reforms, Ministry of Foreign Affairs (1997–1999).

Khan is currently teaching Pakistan's Foreign Relations at the Lahore University of Management Sciences (LUMS) as part of the Social Sciences faculty. He teaches a course titled "Pakistan's Foreign Relations" in Fall semester and a senior level course titled "Critical Issues in Pakistan's Foreign Relations" in Spring semester. At LUMS, he is also the patron of the LUMS Model UN Society (LUMUN).

On 1 July 1994, he was appointed United Nations Secretary-General Boutros Boutros-Ghali's Special Representative to Rwanda, succeeding Jacques-Roger Booh-Booh.  As U.N. Special Representative, he represented the United Nations during the genocide and subsequent refugee crisis. He also remained the chairman of the Pakistan Cricket Board from 10 December 2003 till he resigned on 7 October 2006. On 16 August 2014 he was again appointed as the chairman of the Pakistan Cricket Board.

In 2005 he was made an honorary fellow of Corpus Christi College, Cambridge.

In his retirement, Shaharyar Khan has written a number of books. The Begums of Bhopal is a history of the princely state of Bhopal. The Shallow Graves of Rwanda is an eye-witness account of his two-year stay in a country ravaged by what some might call genocide. Cricket – a Bridge of Peace, about India-Pakistan relations, is his third book. His most personal book has been the biography of his mother Princess Abida Sultaan – Memoirs of a Rebel Princess, which has been translated into Urdu. In 2013 with his son Ali Khan he wrote Cricket Cauldron: The Turbulent Politics of Sport in Pakistan. He has also co-authored a book titled as "Shadows across the playing field; 60 years of India-Pakistan cricket" with renowned Indian writer and politician Shashi Tharoor.

Chairman Pakistan Cricket Board
He has been appointed chairman after he was elected unanimously by the board of governors of Pakistan Cricket Board in the light of new constitution of the PCB 2014 which was approved by the Prime Minister of Pakistan. Khan previously served as the PCB chief in 2003, taking over with the board in turmoil. His tenure is remembered more for Pakistan's 2006 forfeit of the Oval test after being penalised for ball tampering. He was once again appointed the chairman of the Pakistan Cricket Board on 18 August 2014. He served as one of the founders of the Pakistan Super League. He retired from the position in 2017 after completing his term. 

In March 2016, Pakistan was eliminated from the 2016 ICC World Twenty20 after losing 3 matches against India, New Zealand and Australia and only winning against Bangladesh. This caused great controversy over whose 'fault' it was. Khan was amongst those blamed and there were talks about him retiring from PCB after this. However, he later spoke out and said he would not resign. He also said it would be better to bring in a foreign coach, implying that Waqar Younis' coaching contract, which ends in June 2016, will not be renewed. Furthermore, Khan did not release any statements on who he thought was responsible for the loss, but Instead, he said before the match that he will not change Afridi's position because he has been 'serving Pakistan for the last 20 years'. Khan added that changes will happen after the tournament but also noted that the poor performance was from the whole team, except certain individuals.

Personal life
Khan met Minoo Khan, a student at the Queen's College in London in 1957, and married her in 1958 in Karachi.

See also
Foreign relations of Pakistan

References

External links
Profile of Author Shaharyar M. Khan
Musharraf appoints Shahryar new PCB chief
Pakistan cricket in turmoil as Shahryar Khan resigns

Living people
Politicians from Bhopal
People from Karachi
Pashtun people
Foreign Secretaries of Pakistan
Rashtriya Indian Military College alumni
1934 births
Alumni of Corpus Christi College, Cambridge
Fellows of Corpus Christi College, Cambridge
The Fletcher School at Tufts University alumni
Academic staff of Lahore University of Management Sciences
Ambassadors of Pakistan to France
Ambassadors of Pakistan to Jordan
High Commissioners of Pakistan to the United Kingdom
Cricketers from Lahore
Pakistani expatriates in Rwanda
Pakistani expatriates in Tunisia
Pakistan Cricket Board Presidents and Chairmen
Pakistani royalty